Peter Drummond may refer to:

 Peter Drummond (engineer) (1850–1918), Scottish locomotive superintendent
 Peter Drummond (physicist), Australian physicist
 Peter Drummond (politician) (1931–2013), Australian politician
 Peter Drummond (RAF officer) (1894–1945), Australian-born commander in the Royal Air Force
 Peter Robert Drummond (1802–1879), Scottish businessman and biographer
 Peter Drummond (born 1969), former National Chairman of the Architectural Heritage Society of Scotland
 Pete Drummond (born 1943), British voice artist and former BBC and pirate radio disc jockey and announcer
 Pete Drummond (drummer) Australian Drummer, Music Composer 
 Pete Drummond, character in Humans

See also
 Peter Drummond-Burrell, 22nd Baron Willoughby de Eresby (1782–1865), British nobleman
 Peter Drummond-Murray of Mastrick (1929–2014), Scottish banker and authority on heraldry